Kardailovka is a rural locality (a selo) in Mazurskoye Rural Settlement, Povorinsky District, Voronezh Oblast, Russia. The population was 115 as of 2010. There are 5 streets.

Geography 
Kardailovka is located 39 km east of Povorino (the district's administrative centre) by road. Mazurka is the nearest rural locality.

References 

Rural localities in Povorinsky District